Gedu may refer to:

People
 Gedu Andargachew, Ethiopian politician

Places
 Gedu, Bhutan
 Gedu, Iran